Ollisteen 'Steen' Miles (August 20, 1946 – March 29, 2017) was an American politician from the state of Georgia. A member of the Democratic Party, Miles was a former member of the Georgia State Senate. Sworn into office in 2005, Miles served on the Banking and Financial Institutions committee, as well as the Public Safety and Homeland Security, MARTOC, Special Judiciary, and State Institutions and Property Committees.

Miles was a former television newscaster, working for WXIA-TV. She ran for chief executive officer of DeKalb County, Georgia, in 2000 and 2008, losing both times. She also ran for Lieutenant Governor of Georgia in the 2006 election. In the 2014 primary, she ran unsuccessfully for the Democratic nomination for the open United States Senate seat created by Saxby Chambliss's retirement. Miles died on March 29, 2017.

References

External links
The History Makers Profile
Georgia State Senate
 

1946 births
2017 deaths
African-American state legislators in Georgia (U.S. state)
African-American women in politics
Democratic Party Georgia (U.S. state) state senators
Politicians from South Bend, Indiana
People from DeKalb County, Georgia
Ball State University alumni
Georgia State University alumni
Women state legislators in Georgia (U.S. state)
21st-century American politicians
21st-century American women politicians
Deaths from lung cancer
21st-century African-American women
21st-century African-American politicians
20th-century African-American people
20th-century African-American women